Pure Japanese is a 2022 Japanese action film directed by Daishi Matsunaga and starring Dean Fujioka. This is also Fujioka's first created and produced film. Daisuke Tateishi (Fujioka), an eccentric man with no social skills and a devotion to Japanese culture, is now in charge of sound effects for ninja shows, despite his outstanding physical abilities. One day he helps a high school girl named Ayumi (Aju Makita). She and her grandfather Ryuzo (Tetsu Watanabe) are being harassed by yakuza gangsters. When Ayumi asks for his help, Tateishi releases the violent impulses he has kept sealed away due to past trauma. 

The event that led to the creation of Pure Japanese was that Fujioka starred in the 2018 drama The Count of Monte Cristo: Great Revenge. He had been performing abroad, but as he looked at Japan objectively, he began to wonder, "What defines Japanese people?" To this question, he hypothesized using the concepts of "Nihongo-Bito" (Japanese language-people) and "Japanese language OS," resulting in a script with violence and religion as themes. The shooting took place in September 2020 in the Nikko region of Tochigi, as well as at the theme park Nikko Edomura. The film was re-edited many times to make it a more multi-layered story.

Pure Japanese was released in Japan on January 28, 2022. It was screened in the Nippon Visions section of the 22nd Nippon Connection Japanese Film Festival in Germany in May 2022. It was also released on Amazon Prime Video worldwide on July 17, 2022. It received mixed reviews; The Japan Times felt the film was "likely to be misunderstood," and Asian Movie Pulse rated it as having "quite a lot of positive points."

Plot 
Daisuke Tateishi (Dean Fujioka), despite his outstanding physical abilities, lacks social interaction and is a bit of a pariah. At the theme park Nikko Oedomura, where he works, he is in charge of sound effects for the ninja show. He was an eccentric man devoted to Japanese culture. After an accident on a film set, Tateishi has been restricting himself to violence, but by chance, he ends up helping a high school girl named Ayumi (Aju Makita).

Tateishi is affirmed to be violent to protect Ayumi from those who want the land where she lives with her grandfather, Ryuzo (Tetsu Watanabe). Then, when Ayumi asks for help in a crisis, Tateishi releases the violent impulses he has kept sealed away.

Cast

Production

Development 
When the release of Pure Japanese was announced, Dean Fujioka, who created, produced, and starred in the film, said the following: "After the end of my performance in the 2018 drama The Count of Monte-Cristo: Great Revenge (Fuji TV), in the vortex of unusual energy that had been condensed in the days of filming up to that point, my raw self having finished my performance was left behind―――. What should I do to move forward? After much thought, I decided to create and produce original video works." Many of his projects didn't go through. However, Pure Japanese was the first project that would work well both an entertainment and an economic activity, and that also had a clear meaning of "why he creates this to the world."

He had been performing abroad for a long time, but in 2011 he also started working in Japan, where he was born and raised. And as he looked at Japan objectively, he began to wonder, "What defines Japanese people?" As a result, he came to a hypothesis that "people who use the 'operating system' called the Japanese language are 'Nihongo-Bito' (Japanese language-people). The Japanese language OS controls the thoughts and actions of the 'Nihongo-Bito.'" He further wondered, "If the Japanese language OS treats individual life as just a vehicle, delivering Language OS DNAs to the future, where will this demigod-like language OS take the Nihongo-Bito?" He decided to portray this idea as "a case study of Japanese language users" on the theme of "violence" as one aspect of culture. 

He also made "religion" a theme of the film. He got producer Shinji Ogawa to introduce director Daishi Matsunaga and encouraged Matsunaga to read a book on the relationship between religion and violence before starting filming. In an interview with Rooftop, Matsunaga said the following about this: "For those who believe in religious teachings, believing and fighting is a just cause. ... Everyone talks about the right thing, and that's where the collisions and the violence occur. ... Is Tateishi truly a mad person while violence isn't eliminated from the world?" Also, the setting in which the main character is crushed in absurdity and disappears like a sacrifice is one that Fujioka had portrayed from the beginning. Meanwhile, he felt that "it would be nice if there were more opportunities to demonstrate the ability of stylistic beauty that Japanese action has." Therefore, he made it one of his missions to shed light on the existence of action stars and stunt-men in creating this film.

Matsunaga spent a lot of time discussing Fujioka's idea with him, and Matsunaga, Ogawa, and screenwriter Tatsuo Kobayashi stayed overnight for about five days to write the script. In the process, Matsunaga added his taste. According to an interview with Fujioka and Matsunaga in Joshi SPA!, in creating the script, he placed great importance on a kind of "Japanese context," that is, how Japan came to be the social structure it is today. In doing so, the idea of interweaving various cultures, such as using the words of Ludwig Wittgenstein, Yukio Mishima, and Yoshida Shoin, was increasingly generated.

Casting 
In July 2021, the names of Fujioka and Aju Makita were announced as the principal cast members. Regarding his inclusion in the cast as well, Fujioka said in an interview with Oricon: "It's the sense that I used 'Dean Fujioka as an Actor' in making this film project work." About co-starring with Makita, he said in an interview with Fujiteleview!!: "I was hoping that the relationship between Tateishi and Ayumi would be like the distance between Léon and Mathilda in the film Léon. ... I'm glad that the actress Aju Makita was able to infuse this film with something like the echo of her soul at that time." In October 2021, it was announced that professional wrestler Yukio Sakaguchi participated in the film, in addition to Tetsuya Bessho, Tetsu Watanabe, Daichi Kaneko, Jun Murakami, Kyusaku Shimada, and others. In an interview with Rooftop, Matsunaga said of Sakaguchi: "Dean-san originally built up his body for this film, so I thought it would be better if the actor playing the role of Jinnai also had a built-up body. The visual persuasiveness of the real thing, that 'this person is really strong,' is very powerful in images. I thought that Sakaguchi-san could bring out that." Fujioka also said in the introductory speeches at the film's completion preview in January 2022: "I think Sakaguchi-san's appearance was a major factor in making the film a winner."

Filming 
The shooting took place in September 2020 in the Nikko region of Tochigi. It also took place at the theme park Nikko Edomura. This location was chosen because it was a perfect place to artificially purify and display things that have been lost or no longer exist, like a museum exhibiting stuffed animals that have become extinct, and also because it was the perfect place to have Ninja shows.

According to Fujioka, he had been practicing action scenes for about three months before the shoot. That's because actual action and the Ninja shows were completely different in style. For the action, he got a basic flow at the action team's studio first. He learned the Ninja moves after going to Nikko. He practiced a few times with the actual Ninja players at Nikko Edomura. He also kept working out between the shoots.

The climactic action scene was first created by Fujioka and action choreographer Eiji Morisaki. Since the location was slightly changed on the day of filming, the action assembly was also slightly modified. According to Fujioka, he wanted to be very particular about the action, but there wasn't enough time, and he couldn't make the ideal schedule.

Post-production 
In the post-production phase, Matsunaga and the engineers took the lead, while Fujioka oversaw the entire production as the project's creator. Considering "how it would look not only to the Nihongo-Bito but also to people who don't understand the Japanese language or have no interest in Japan," they re-edited the film many times, changed the script, and rearranged the story once again. Fujioka's English monologue was thought up after the editing was finished. Fujioka said in an interview with MOVIE Collection: "I think that as long as I can carry out my original intention, the expression can be changed if there is a better way to do it. The shooting script and the completed work are, therefore, totally different. I think the script was of sufficient quality for shooting the material, but we persisted in elevating it to a more multi-layered story." The film took more than three years from creation to completion.

Release 
The teaser and main visuals for Pure Japanese, created by photographer RK, were unveiled on August 19 and October 7, 2021, respectively. The film was released theatrically in Japan, where it was distributed by Amuse Inc., on January 28, 2022. It was screened in the Nippon Visions section of the 22nd Nippon Connection Japanese Film Festival in Germany in May 24 to 29, 2022. Meanwhile, it began distribution simultaneously worldwide on Amazon Prime Video on July 17, 2022.

Music 

The soundtrack was released only for distribution. Hiroko Sebu composed all 16 tracks.

Home media 
The film was released on Blu-ray and DVD by Amuse Soft on November 16, 2022. Both discs have English subtitles and special features, including trailers and audio commentary. The Blu-ray, a deluxe edition, also includes making-of Pure Japanese, a video of the stage greeting to thank for the film's release, and a photo book.

Reception 
James Hadfield of The Japan Times gave the film three stars out of five, saying that "Pure Japanese is likely to be misunderstood ― all the more so, given that it's played totally straight. ... "It's closer to the self-reflexive cinema that Takashi Miike and Sion Sono used to do so well, giving audiences a bit of the old ultra-violence while forcing them to question what they're watching." Hideyuki Nakazawa of Cinema Today gave the film three stars out of five. He felt that it "reeks of a bad cult" and described it as "a controversial work that reflects a Japanese man who seeks identity in the unscientific illusion of 'pure Japanese' and goes mad quietly, and a collapsing Japanese society." Another Cinema Today's film critic, Hibiki Kurei, also gave it three stars out of five, saying that "Fujioka's eccentric sense as a creator, who previously directed I am Ichihashi: Journal of a Murderer, is apparent at a glance, as the modern ninja he plays, who is completely crazy with a disturbing atmosphere similar to a mysterious man in the film The Man from the Sea. Therefore, in the development where Tateishi confronts the Chinese broker and the yakuza, the absurdity of trying to justify his way of life explodes while he looks like a hero who saves the world."

Don Anelli of Asian Movie Pulse said that the use of a traditional story setting by screenwriter Tatsuo Kobayashi "works incredibly well as a standalone effort. ... There's a series of fun brawls and confrontations that take place here which have a nice energy contained and come across nicely when Daisuke gains a fury and intensity to fight back." Also, he said that the film has some minor issues, such as "the general overfamiliarity present with the storyline by Kobayashi" and "the low-budget qualities," but it "has quite a lot of positive points to like about it which are only somewhat hindered by a minor set of flaws that may not even apply to most viewers."

References

External links 
Official website 

2022 films
2020s Japanese films
2020s Japanese-language films
2022 action films
2022 action drama films
Japanese action films
Japanese films about revenge
Japanese martial arts films
Films set in Japan
Films set in Tochigi Prefecture
Films shot in Tochigi Prefecture